Jackson Township is an inactive township in Maries County, in the U.S. state of Missouri.

Jackson Township has the name of Jackson Terrill, a local judge.

References

Townships in Missouri
Townships in Maries County, Missouri